Botev may refer to:

Places
 Botevgrad
 Botev Peak, the highest peak of the Balkan mountains
 Botev Point

Sports
 FC Botev Galabovo, a football club from Galabovo
 OFC Botev Ihtiman, a football club from Ihtiman
 FC Botev Krivodol, a football club from Krivodol
 FC Botev Lukovit, a football club from Lukovit
 FC Botev Novi Pazar, a football club from Novi Pazar
 PFC Botev Plovdiv, a football club from Plovdiv
 POFC Botev Vratsa, a football club from Vratsa

Other uses
 Botev (surname)
 Hristo Botev Stadium (disambiguation)